Minconsult is a private limited engineering consultancy in Malaysia. Founded in 1962, the company specialises in multi-disciplinary engineering and project management. Capable of providing a wide range of engineering consultancy services in the civil & structural, mechanical, electrical, petrochemical and environmental fields. Minconsult have since established foreign offices in Pakistan, Australia, Kazakshtan and Bangladesh.

Minconsult is known for their major involvement in the Malaysian energy industry having designed a good percentage of power plants constructed in Malaysia.

Dato' Ir. Dr. Dennis Ganendra is the first Chief Executive  Officer of the company in its 60 year history, and is an Executive Director.

Field of Specialisation
Airport
Bridge
Drainage Irrigation and Water Resources
Electrical Services
Environmental Services
Geotechnical Services
Highway
Infrastructure Services
Marine Services
Mechanical Services
Oil & Gas
Power & industrial
Power Plant And Renewable Energy
Project Management
Railway and Light Rail Transit
Public Health
Solid Waste Management
Structures
Town Planning
Transportation and Planning
Water Supply

Notable Projects
Sultan Salahuddin Abdul Aziz Power Station

Awards
Industry Excellecnce Award 2009 for Export Excellence (Services) from Ministry of International Trade and Industry (MITI)
Gold Award 2008 for Ir. P. Ganendra in recognition of his significant contributions to the engineering consultancy industry from Association of Consulting Engineers Malaysia (ACEM)
Engineering Award 2008 for Silver Award of Merit for A-380 MAS Hangar at MAS Complex, Kuala Lumpur International Airport from Association of Consulting Engineers Malaysia (ACEM)
Industry Excellence Award 2003 for Export Excellence (Services) from Ministry of International Trade and Industry (MITI)
Engineering Award 1998 for Award of Special Merit for Lumut Combined Cycle Power Plant Project from Association of Consulting Engineers Malaysia (ACEM)

References

Minconsult official website

1962 establishments in Malaya
Companies based in Petaling Jaya
Consulting firms established in 1962
Construction and civil engineering companies of Malaysia
Electric power companies of Malaysia
Malaysian brands
Privately held companies of Malaysia
Malaysian companies established in 1962
Construction and civil engineering companies established in 1962